Voenizdat was a publishing house in Moscow, Russia that was one of the first and largest publishing houses in USSR. The name is a Russian abbreviation for "Voennoe Izdatelstvo", meaning "Military Publication".  

Voenizdat was established by Revvoyensoviet on 25 October 1919. The initial aim was to publish literature for the needs of Ministry of Defence. It later published both fiction and non-fiction literature, technical manuals and dictionaries. The company was absorbed into Red Star in 2009.

References

External links 
Worldcat datadase entries

Book publishing companies of Russia
Publishing companies of the Soviet Union
1919 establishments in Russia
Publishing companies established in 1919
Military of the Soviet Union
Companies based in Moscow